Michael Jackson's Journey from Motown to Off the Wall is a 2016 documentary film directed by Spike Lee, chronicling the rise of pop star Michael Jackson through the creation of his landmark solo album, Off the Wall (1979). It is the second Michael Jackson-focused documentary Lee has made, after Bad 25 (2012). The film premiered on January 24, 2016, at the 2016 Sundance Film Festival.

Cast

Release
Michael Jackson's Journey from Motown to Off the Wall premiered at the Sundance Film Festival at Park City, Utah on January 24, 2016. It was shown on the American television network Showtime on February 5. The film was released along with a reissue of the original Off the Wall album on February 26.

References

40 Acres and a Mule Filmworks films
American documentary films
Films directed by Spike Lee
Documentary films about Michael Jackson
2010s English-language films
2010s American films